Pomeroon can refer to either of the following:

Pomeroon River, a river in Guyana;
Pomeroon-Supenaam, a region in Guyana;
Pomeroon (colony), a former colony in Guyana.